Erling Erland (12 July 1917 – 13 January 1988) was a Norwegian politician and Member of Parliament for Anders Lange's Party.

Erland was born in Time. He started as a student in 1937, and was educated as an engineer from the Norwegian Institute of Technology in 1943. He worked for Erlands Maskin in Bryne from 1943 to 1952, and since then worked as a teacher, and later lector, for the Technical School of Stavanger.

He was editor of the Anders Lange's Party electoral newspaper, Anders in 1973. He was elected to the Norwegian Parliament from Rogaland in 1973 where he sat until 1977.

References

1917 births
1988 deaths
People from Time, Norway
Progress Party (Norway) politicians
Rogaland politicians
20th-century Norwegian politicians